CILS-FM is a Canadian radio station, which broadcasts at 107.9 FM in Victoria, British Columbia. Branded as Radio Victoria, the station airs a community radio format for the region's Franco-Columbian community.

The station was licensed by the Canadian Radio-television and Telecommunications Commission (CRTC) in 2005. The station currently broadcasts from studios at the École Victor-Brodeur francophone school in suburban Esquimalt.

The station is a member of the Alliance des radios communautaires du Canada.

References

External links
Radio Victoria
 
 

ILS
ILS
ILS
Radio stations established in 2005
2005 establishments in British Columbia